Nehorai (also transliterated as Nehoray, Neoray, Neorai) is a male Hebrew name נְהוֹרַאי , from Aramaic נְהוֹר nehor or נְהוֹרָא nehora meaning "light". The name appears three times in the Mishnah. He who was called Nehorai because he enlightened the eyes of his peers in knowledge of halakhah.

People
 Eleazar ben Arach, who may have received the nickname Nehorai 
 Nehorai Garmon (–1760), Tunisian poet
 Nehorai Ifrah, Israeli footballer
 Rabbi Meir, whose previous name was Nehorai 
 Shalom Nehorai HaLevi, Yemenite Rabbi from Beit 'Adaqah who founded Tzuriel
 Yair Nehorai, Israeli lawyer and author

See also
Hebrew name
Noor

References

Hebrew masculine given names
Hebrew-language surnames